Allumiere is a  (municipality) in the Metropolitan City of Rome in the Italian region of Latium, located about  northwest of Rome.

History
Although evidence of human settlements in the local area date back to the Neolithic age, the origins of the modern town of Allumiere are relatively recent.
Allumiere was founded in the late 15th century to house the workers and the administrators of the important mines of alunite of the nearby Monti della Tolfa range. The exploitation lasted until 1941.
The mines in question were found shortly after the fall of the Eastern Roman Empire (1453). Before that date, the State of the Church used to buy alunite from there, but following the Turkish conquest, they had to find alternatives.

Main sights
 Parish Church of St. Mary's Assumption (Santa Maria Assunta in Cielo) is the main Church in Allumiere. It's located in the central square, in front of the town hall.
 Borgo della Farnesiana is a settlement built in the 16th century to service the mining industry: today is a semi-abandoned frazione in the Municipality of Allumiere. The impressive Neo-Gothic Church of Maria Santissima alla mola della Farnesiana, which dates back to 1850, is the main monuments. In the nearby are located an old mill and anold public oven.

Twin towns
 Puçol, Spain
 Deutschkreutz, Austria
 Eglfing, Germany

References

External links
 www.allumiere.org/
 Archeological sites

Cities and towns in Lazio